Kristen Campbell (born November 30, 1997) is a Canadian ice hockey goaltender, currently with the PWHPA. She was the first woman to win the Frozen Four championship without conceding a goal.

Career
Campbell began her university career at the University of North Dakota but was forced to transfer to Wisconsin in 2017 after North Dakota dropped its women's hockey programme. She would become the fourth goaltender in Wisconsin history to record 90 wins with the university, being named WCHA Goaltender of the Year and a top-10 finalist for the Patty Kazmaier Memorial Award in 2018. In 2019, she would backstop the university to their first national championship since 2011.

After graduating, she joined the PWHPA ahead of the 2020-21 season.

International
Campbell represented Team Canada at the 2015 IIHF World Women's U18 Championship, winning a silver medal. In May 2021, she was one of 28 players invited to Hockey Canada's Centralization Camp, which represents the selection process for the Canadian women's team that shall compete in Ice hockey at the 2022 Winter Olympics.

On January 11, 2022, Campbell was named to Canada's 2022 Olympic team.

Personal life
Campbell has a degree in rehabilitation psychology.

References

External links

1997 births
Living people
Canadian women's ice hockey goaltenders
Ice hockey people from Manitoba
Ice hockey players at the 2022 Winter Olympics
Medalists at the 2022 Winter Olympics
Olympic gold medalists for Canada
Olympic ice hockey players of Canada
Olympic medalists in ice hockey
Professional Women's Hockey Players Association players
Sportspeople from Brandon, Manitoba
Wisconsin Badgers women's ice hockey players